KEF is a British company specialising in the design and production of a range of high-end audio products, including HiFi speakers, subwoofers, architecture speakers, wireless speakers, and headphones. It was founded in Maidstone, Kent in 1961 by a BBC engineer Raymond Cooke OBE (1925–1995).

KEF is named after its original site, Kent Engineering and Foundry. Product development, acoustical technology research and the manufacture of signature products still occurs at the original Maidstone site in England. KEF’s ethos is based on the continuing quest to find new and better ways of reproducing sound. Since the company’s establishment, KEF has always driven innovation in sound. KEF was the first loudspeaker manufacturer in the world to implement the use of computers in loudspeaker design and measurement. KEF introduced the world’s first coincident source speaker driver called Uni-Q in 1988 which has evolved to 12th generation since then, and it is still featured in almost all its speakers today. KEF is the first company to use metamaterial to absorb the unwanted sound from the rear of speaker driver in HiFi industry, the technology is called Metamaterial Absorption Technology (MAT).

KEF has received over 300 awards and holds more than 150 patents. KEF also published more than 50 academic papers and has received two Queen’s Awards for Export Achievement.

History

1960s 
Raymond Cooke and Robert Pearch founded KEF Electronics Ltd., with a view to creating innovative loudspeakers using the latest in materials technology. KEF Electronics was founded in Kent in 1961 and was physically situated on land adjacent to the River Medway in Tovil which at the time was owned by Kent Engineering & Foundry (a company owned by Robert Pearch and founded by his father Leonard) who at the time manufactured agricultural equipment and industrial sweeping machines. KEF derived its name from the firm.

Cooke was a Royal Navy WWII veteran who was a design engineer at the British Broadcasting Corporation (BBC) for a year. He was later Technical Director at Wharfedale, then a leading British loudspeaker manufacturer. Following corporate change at Wharfedale, Cooke left to see his own ideas put into action. Cooke acquired the site of a foundry, makers of agricultural machines, and initially worked in Nissen huts erected on the site in Tovil, Maidstone. KEF was also an early-adopter of modern quality-control principles to driver manufacture.

The first loudspeaker manufactured was the K1 Slimline for which the drive units used diaphragms made of polystyrene and melinex. Soon after, in 1962, came the famous B139 'racetrack' shaped woofer which allowed the design of the Celeste – one of the first truly high performance bookshelf loudspeakers.  As Laurie Fincham, Cooke's successor as chief engineer, later revealed, the only reason the B139 was vertically mounted ovoid-shaped was that the British tax code at the time penalised 2 way speakers below a certain arbitrary width. Professional products were not taxed and professional was defined as above 8 inches for a woofer or as a 3 way speaker.

From the mid-1960s, KEF manufactured BBC-designed monitor loudspeakers such as the LS5/1A for the Corporation and for wider distribution. Cooke's previous relationship with the BBC in the 1950s continued as KEF developed through the 1960s and 70s. In the mid-1960s KEF introduced the bextrene-coned B110 bass/midrange unit and the melinex-domed T27 tweeter which were later used in the diminutive BBC-designed LS3/5A broadcast monitor, of which over 50,000 pairs were sold worldwide and whose initial specification was for use in cramped broadcast vans. The close co-operation between KEF and the BBC Research department was fruitful for both, as BBC provided stringent performance and production standards with ample capacity for field testing, with KEF being a pioneer in the use of polymers and computerised quality control.

1970s 
 
In the 1970s, as "KEF Electronics Limited", the company was awarded two Queens Awards for Export Achievement as the company became known beyond the UK (1970 and 1975). This further substantiated Raymond Cooke's choice of location for his factory as it "was closer to Europe" and hence transportation costs for its goods would be cheaper.

In 1973, KEF became the first loudspeaker manufacturer in the world to implement the use of computers in loudspeaker design and measurement. KEF used the digital technologies to achieve the highest audio accuracy, every pair of Reference Model 104 can be matched within 0.5dB to the laboratory-maintained reference standard.

LS3/5a was the original mini monitor inspired by KEF drivers and designed at the BBC that transformed the audio experience in 1975. It was renowned for delivering accurate precise sound for the recording and broadcast industry and is still spoken about in reverential tones today.
 
In 1976, the design methodology was refined into a new approach to loudspeaker development – computer assisted ‘Total System Design’ – with the release of the Corelli, Calinda and Cantata. A year later in 1977, Reference Model 105 was launched as one of the most radical and sophisticated loudspeakers ever made. 

In addition to making speakers, a substantial part of KEF's activity was as an OEM supplier of loudspeaker systems, baffles and drivers. Cooke decided early on that huge potential benefits could be reaped from selling raw drivers to competitors, that more than outweighed the cannibalisation of their own market position. In a relatively short time, many major and renowned loudspeaker manufacturers came to source their drive units from KEF. Users included illustrious British brands such as IMF, Rogers, Celef, Monitor Audio, as well as manufacturers outside UK, including Sonus Faber and Wilson Audio. Linn Products of Scotland also elected to use KEF drive units in the Linn Isobarik., Linn Sara and Linn Kan speakers. The company's KEFKITs also provided many hi-fi hobbyists with means to apply their woodworking skills into making their own speakers. At its peak, production of drive units reached 10,000 units per week. In 1979, Queen Elizabeth II awarded Cooke an OBE.

1980s 
Throughout the 1980s, a series of technology was enhanced including coupled-cavity bass loading that considerably boosted bass performance, force-cancelling and driver decoupling to eliminate cabinet coloration, and the KEF Universal Bass Equaliser (KUBE) that allowed extended bass from compact enclosures.  

In 1988, KEF designed and patented the world’s first truly coincident source speaker driver Uni-Q that enlarged the optimum listening area, allowing everyone sitting at different spots in the room to experience the same quality of sound.

1990s 
Throughout the 1990s KEF continued to design products including Coda 7, Q Series, Reference Series Model 109 and Monitor Series. The Reference Series Model 105/3 featuring the second generation of Uni-Q technology was voted ‘Best imported Speaker’ by the Japanese press in 1992.

The New York Times has recognised KEF as "a leading audio company in Europe", and also "well known to American High-End audiophiles".

In 1992, KEF was acquired by Gold Peak Group.

In 1993, KEF introduced the Model 100 centre speaker. In the following year, KEF released a THX approved home theatre system – a subwoofer/satellite concept with vertically directional front speakers and dipole surrounds. 

Founder Raymond Cooke OBE passed away in 1995. He left the KEF with firm guiding principles encapsulated in his core values of ‘Quality, Honesty, Dedication and Innovation’.

2000s 
In the 2000s, KEF has been developing the use of magnetic and mechanical modelling techniques in speaker designs including Finite Element Analysis allowing acoustic systems to be modelled to an accuracy not previously achievable using other methods. The Reference Series Model 207/2 was launched in with major upgrades from the previous Reference Series. In 2005, KEF introduced the ACE (Acoustic Compliance Enhancement) technology, a technology that enables the same bass performance as a conventional speaker of twice the size, after a comprehensive research and development program since the late 1980s. 

In 2007, Muon was launched at the Milan Furniture Fair. It was the first collaboration of KEF and leading Industrial designer Ross Lovegrove. The Muon is limited to an edition of 100 pairs worldwide. The patented Tangerine Waveguide was introduced to the 8th generation of Uni-Q driver array in 2007 with improvement on sensitivity and sound dispersion. This innovation was applied with the launch of KHT3005 – the iconic ‘EGG” home theatre system.

2010s 
In 2011, KEF launched The BLADE, KEF engineers was briefed to design an ultimate loudspeaker without design or cost limitations. Single Apparent Source configuration technology was released and featured in The BLADE. In 2012, KEF launched a new classic LS50 as a 50th anniversary product. LS50 took the original LS3/5a studio monitor concept and brought it to the living room. In 2017, KEF introduced the first wireless HiFi speakers, LS50 Wireless. In the following years, KEF introduced a number of wireless products including the EGG wireless speakers, MUO portable speakers, M Series headphones, and the collaboration with Porsche Design consisting Gravity One portable speakers, Motion One earphones and Space One wireless headphones.

2020s and beyond 
In 2020, KEF introduced the use of Metamaterial Absorption Technology (aka MAT) in speaker design. The technology has been awarded the "Innovation of the Year" by What Hi-Fi? Awards 2020. The new technology has been implemented in the new LS50 Collection, consisting of LS50 Meta and LS50 Wireless II. In 2021, the Michael Young designed KC62 subwoofer was launched with a new technology called "Uni-Core". This technology combines both drivers into a single motor system allowing cabinet size to be reduced by over a third, while also increasing excursion to generate greater output and depth. In the same year, KEF announced its first automotive partnership with Lotus, bringing its Uni-Q technology in a 10-channel sound system into the Lotus Emira premium sport car. In 2022 the release of new LSX II and LS60 wireless speakers, also designed by Michael Young, received favourable reviews in the specialist and general press, with Wired magazine calling the LS60 an "Absolute Triumph".

Technology

In the early 1970s KEF was the first company to adopt computers for the testing and design of loudspeakers leading to the 'Total System Design' methodology and more sophisticated production techniques such as driver 'pair matching'. The radical Model 105 system, released in 1977, embodied this new philosophy and was one of the most highly regarded loudspeakers of its time.  KEF, Bowers & Wilkins and Celestion were the "big three" British loudspeaker makers of the seventies and eighties, and pioneered the use of advanced materials and techniques in audio.

Other technologies developed and brought to the market by KEF have included:
driver decoupling (Model 105.2, 1979), a technique of reducing cabinet coloration by mounting drivers via controlled lossy coupling
coupled-cavity bass loading (Model 104/2, 1984), a technique of pairing two bass drive units and feeding their output via a single port  
conjugate load matching (Model 104/2, 1984), a crossover optimisation technique that presents a constant (albeit low) ohmic load to the amplifier
the "KEF Universal Bass Equaliser" (aka "KUBE") (Model 107, 1986), a technique to overcome the unavoidable phase lag present at low frequencies
Uni-Q (C-Series, 1988), a patented implementation of coincident midrange and tweeter drivers that strives to preserve phase integrity and match dispersion between the drivers resulting in improved stereo imagery. It enlarged the optimum listening area, allowing everyone sitting at different spots in the room to experience the same quality sound.
Acoustic Compliance Enhancement (aka “ACE”) (Muon, 2005), a technology that enables the same bass performance as a conventional speaker of twice the size
Single Apparent Source Technology (Blade, 2011), a technique of configuring speakers to cover the entire bandwidth of the loudspeaker, enables all frequencies appear to radiate from one single point.
Metamaterial Absorption Technology (aka ‘MAT’) (LS50 Meta 2020), a complex maze-like structure, where each of the intricate channels absorbs a specific frequency. When combined, the channels absorb the unwanted sound that comes from the rear of the tweeter, thereby reducing distortion and improving sound clarity.
Uni-Core (KC62, 2021), a patent-pending technology, combines the dual force-cancelling drive units into a single motor system with the overlapping voice coils concentrically arranged thus reducing the size of the speaker or subwoofer cabinet.

Uni-Q Technology 
Developed by KEF in 1988, the Uni-Q driver array combines the midrange and woofer to avoid driver to driver interference. It acts as a single point source, providing pristine sound across a wider area. In conventional loudspeakers, mid and high frequencies radiating from different locations interfere with each other. Uni-Q places the tweeter at the centre of the bass/midrange cone, dispersing these different frequencies from a single point source, so interference issues are avoided, and the sound is less distorted. With Uni-Q’s single point source design, all frequencies reach your ear at the same time. The sound is therefore more accurate and realistic than with conventional loudspeakers, where the output from each separate driver arrives at slightly different times, causing the sound to be smeared and less natural sounding.

Metamaterial Absorption Technology (aka 'MAT') 
MAT is a joint development with the Acoustic Metamaterials Group. Metamaterials are specially developed structures that use existing materials in such a way that they exhibit new, desirable properties that are simply not found in naturally occurring substances. KEF is the first loudspeaker manufacturer who deployed metamaterial in Hi-Fi speakers. MAT is a maze-like structure, where each of the intricate channels efficiently absorbs a specific frequency. This maze-like structure is a compact disc sits behind the tweeter which absorbs unwanted sound radiating from the rear of the driver, reducing distortion and enabling the prevention of audio distraction.

Metamaterial Absorption Technology (MAT) has been awarded 'Innovation of the Year' in 2020 What Hi-Fi? Awards. Metamaterial Absorption Technology (MAT) was first introduced with the KEF LS50 Meta and LS50 Wireless II (2020). The LS50 Meta and LS50 Wireless II have also been awarded with 'Product of the Year' in the Stereo speakers category and All-in-one-system category in the What Hi-Fi? Awards respectively.

Uni-Core Technology 
Uni-Core technology, a patent-pending technology, combines two force-cancelling drivers into a single motor system. The overlapping voice coils are in different diameters and concentrically arranged. This configuration allows for more driver excursion than in other force cancelling design, delivering more output and depth from less cabinet size. The technology was first applied in the KC62 subwoofer (2021). The compact subwoofer is only the size of a football, equipped with two 6.5inch force cancelling drive units powered by 1,000W RMS of Class D amplification. KEF KC62 subwoofer was judged to be the very best in EISA’s HiFi Subwoofer 2021-2022 category and awarded “Product of the Year 2021” in subwoofer category in StereoNET.

Single Apparent Source Technology 
In a conventional loudspeaker design, drivers producing different frequencies radiate from separate points causing interference as the drivers interact. Single Apparent Source Technology eliminates this interference by ensuring the entire frequency range radiates from one point in space, resulting precise imaging and highly accurate sound across a wider area. To achieve a single point source, four low-frequency drivers in symmetrically opposing pairs are tightly packed around a two-way Uni-Q driver where the mid-frequency and high-frequency share the same acoustic centre. This technique was implemented to the Concept Blade in 2011 which KEF called it the world’s first Single Apparent Source loudspeaker.

Products

HiFi Speakers 
Muon
Blade and Blade 2 Meta
The Reference
R Series
Q Series
LS50 Meta
T Series

Wireless HiFi Speakers 

LS60 Wireless
 LS50 Wireless II
 LSX
 LSX 'Soundwave Edition'
 LSX II
 EGG Duo

Headphones 

 Mu3

Subwoofers 

 Reference 8b
 KF92
 KC62
 KUBE
 T2

Architectural 

 THX Extreme Home Theatre
 In-wall Speakers
 in-ceiling Speakers
 Outdoor Speakers

References

External links

 Company website KEF loudspeakers
KEF Reference 207/2 loudspeaker review by stereophile.com 17 February 2008
KEF Reference 1 Bookshelf Loudspeaker (archive-link)

Electronics companies established in 1961
Loudspeaker manufacturers
Audio equipment manufacturers of the United Kingdom
English brands
1961 establishments in England